Benjamin Polk (born 19 September 1992) is an American soccer player.

Career
Polk began his career in the youth setup of Oxford United, but was released after six years with the club. He later signed with local side Banbury United, where he played as a midfielder until 2013 when he accepted a college soccer scholarship at Genesee Community College. After one year with Genesee, Polk transferred to Herkimer County Community College in 2013, and again in 2015 when he spent a year at Syracuse University.

While at college, Polk spent time with Premier Development League side K-W United FC in 2015.

On January 14, 2016, Polk was selected in the first round (20th overall) of the 2016 MLS SuperDraft by Portland Timbers.

Polk signed with United Soccer League side Orlando City B on December 6, 2016. His contract expired in October 2017.

References

External links
 
 

1992 births
Living people
Association football forwards
Banbury United F.C. players
Bedworth United F.C. players
English expatriate footballers
English expatriate sportspeople in the United States
English footballers
Expatriate soccer players in the United States
Orlando City B players
Sportspeople from Banbury
Portland Timbers draft picks
Portland Timbers players
Portland Timbers 2 players
Soccer players from Phoenix, Arizona
Syracuse Orange men's soccer players
USL Championship players